Urali is a southern Dravidian language that is closely related to Kannada. It is spoken by the Urali tribe in the hills around Bargur in northwestern Tamil Nadu. It is still commonly spoken among the community.

References

Dravidian languages